José DeLeón Chestaro (born December 20, 1960) is a Dominican former professional baseball right-handed pitcher who played in Major League Baseball (MLB) with the Pittsburgh Pirates, Chicago White Sox, St. Louis Cardinals, Philadelphia Phillies, and Montreal Expos, over all or parts of 13 seasons (–). For his career, he compiled a win–loss record of 86–119, in 415 appearances, with a 3.76 earned run average (ERA), and 1,594 strikeouts.

DeLeón was a 3rd round draft pick of the Pittsburgh Pirates in the 1979 amateur draft.

See also
 List of Major League Baseball annual strikeout leaders
 List of St. Louis Cardinals team records

External links

1960 births
Living people
Dominican Republic expatriate baseball players in Canada
Dominican Republic expatriate baseball players in the United States
Buffalo Bisons (minor league) players
Chicago White Sox players
Gulf Coast Pirates players
Hawaii Islanders players

Major League Baseball pitchers
Major League Baseball players from the Dominican Republic
Montreal Expos players
National League strikeout champions
Philadelphia Phillies players
Pittsburgh Pirates players
Portland Beavers players
Shelby Pirates players
St. Louis Cardinals players
Perth Amboy High School alumni
Dominican Republic emigrants to the United States